The Bahamas Lawn Tennis Association (BLTA) is the governing body for tennis in the Bahamas.

History 
The Bahamas Lawn Tennis Association (BLTA) is a non-profit organization and is the governing body for tennis in the Bahamas. Its mission is to lead the growth and promotion of the sport of tennis throughout the islands of the Bahamas.  The BLTA is a member of the International Tennis Federation as well as the regional governing body Central American and Caribbean Tennis Confederation (COTECC).

Bahamas Sports Hall of Fame - Tennis Inductees

Presidents

Affiliations 
 International Tennis Federation (ITF)
 Central American and Caribbean (COTECC)
 Bahamas Olympic Committee

References 

Sports governing bodies in the Bahamas
National members of the Central American & Caribbean Tennis Confederation
National members of the International Tennis Federation